Conocardium is an extinct genus of Rostroconchian mollusk. It fed on tiny plants and animals in the water. Fossils have been found all over the world from Ordovician to Permian formations.

Species 
The following species have been described:

 C. acadianum
 C. aliforme (type)
 C. altum
 C. aquisgranense
 C. armatum
 C. cresswelli
 C. decussatum
 C. denticulatum
 C. elongatum
 C. eximum
 C. ferox
 C. formosum
 C. frater
 C. fusiforme
 C. gogoensis
 C. gympiense
 C. hainense
 C. immatura
 C. incarceratum
 C. inceptum
 C. inflatum
 C. konincki
 C. longipennis C. lyelli C. nexile C. oehlerti C. philipsii C. plinthinatus C. prunum C. pseudobellum C. regulare C. renardi C. retusum C. richmondense C. securiforme C. sowerbyi C. spinalatum C. tripartitum C. truncata C. truncatum C. uralicum C. ventriculosum C. villmarense''

References

Further reading 
 Dinosaurs to Dodos: An Encyclopedia of Extinct Animals by Don Lessem and Jan Sovak
 Parker, Steve. Dinosaurus: the complete guide to dinosaurs. Firefly Books Inc, 2003. Pg. 40

Ordovician molluscs
Silurian molluscs
Devonian molluscs
Carboniferous molluscs
Permian molluscs
Ordovician first appearances
Lopingian genus extinctions
Fossils of Sweden
Fossils of Poland
Fossils of India
Silurian Brazil
Fossils of Brazil
Permian Peru
Fossils of Peru
Paleozoic life of Alberta
Paleozoic life of the Northwest Territories
Paleozoic life of Nunavut
Fossil taxa described in 1835
Taxa named by Heinrich Georg Bronn